God's Providence House may refer to:

God's Providence House, Chester
God's Providence House, Newport